Perisyntrocha ossealis is a moth in the family Crambidae. It is found in India (Sikkim, Nagas).

References

Moths described in 1896
Spilomelinae